"Catch Us If You Can" is a 1965 song by The Dave Clark Five.

Catch Us If You Can may also refer to:

 Catch Us If You Can (film), a 1965 film by John Boorman
 "Catch Us If You Can" (Grounded for Life episode), a 2001 episode of the sitcom Grounded for Life
 Catch Us If You Can (game show), an Australian television series

See also 
 Catch Me If You Can (disambiguation)